A debate show is a television show genre based around a debate. Usually it is hosted by a moderator.

Examples 
In the United States, Crossfire was a current events debate television program that aired from 1982 to 2005 on CNN. Crossballs: The Debate Show on Comedy Central parodied Crossfire and other shows of its ilk.

The Debaters is a Canadian radio comedy show in which two debaters (usually stand up comedians) debate topics, which are deliberately comedic (such as "backseat drivers are helpful", "gravity is our friend" and "cats are smarter than dogs". The winner is chosen by audience applause at the end of the debate.

Much of the weekday schedule for sports networks such as ESPN in multiple nations, FS1 in the United States, Fox Sports in Australia, and TSN/RDS in Canada is filled with various debate shows regarding daily sports topics in the news, or even individual sports, when live sports are not occurring.

Television genres